The 1947 East Texas State Lions football team represented the East Texas State Teachers College (later renamed the Texas A&M University–Commerce) as a member of the Lone Star Conference (LSC) during the 1947 college football season. In its ninth season under head coach Bob Berry, the team compiled an 8–2 record (4–2 against conference opponents) and tied for second place in the Lone Star Conference. The team played its home games at East Texas Stadium in Commerce, Texas.

James "Cargo" Batchelor led the team on offense. He was inducted into the Texas A&M-Commerce/East Texas State University Athletic Hall of Fame in 1979.

Schedule

References

East Texas State
Texas A&M–Commerce Lions football seasons
East Texas State Lions football